KDTI (90.3 FM, "K-Love 2000s") is a radio station broadcasting a Christian contemporary music format focusing on songs from the 2000s. Licensed to Rochester Hills, Michigan, United States, the station is currently owned by the Educational Media Foundation.

Formerly licensed to Sheridan, Wyoming, on March 10, 2015, the station moved to Rochester Hills, Michigan (a suburb of Detroit) and signed on at 90.3 MHz with an effective radiated power of 37 watts. At this time, the station also switched to K-Love's sister network, Air1. It is the second licensed radio station in the state of Michigan with a call sign beginning with the letter K, with the first being KTGG in Spring Arbor. 

In October 2018, the station flipped to the EMF's K-Love Classics network. In November 2020, the station flipped to "K-Love Christmas" for the holiday season after the national discontinuation of K-Love Classics, emerging under the new "K-Love 2000s" format in January 2021.

References

External links
 
 

Rochester Hills, Michigan
Radio stations established in 2009
2009 establishments in Michigan
Educational Media Foundation radio stations
K-Love radio stations